Mariavittoria Becchetti (born 12 December 1994) is an Italian racewalker.

She won a bronze medal with the Italian team at the 2019 European Race Walking Cup.

Achievements

See also
 Italy at the European Race Walking Cup

References

External links
 

1994 births
Living people
Italian female racewalkers
World Athletics Championships athletes for Italy
Athletes from Rome